Spyros Risvanis (Greek: Σπύρος Ρισβάνης; born 3 January 1994) is a Greek professional footballer who plays as a centre-back for Slovak Fortuna Liga club DAC Dunajská Streda.

Club career
On 30 July 2013, Risvanis signed his first professional contract with Panathinaikos along with two other players. On 15 September 2013, he made his professional debut on a draw in a match against Platanias. On 2 January 2015, he signed a contract for six months with Panionios, on loan from Panathinaikos.

On 19 July 2015, Panathinaikos released the player who signed a two years' contract to Panionios, but in order to be certain of the benefits received in a possible future transfer to a bigger club, put a 25% resale percentage for the next three transfer periods, and up to December 31, 2016, reserves the right to "tie" any proposal that would accept Panionios. Moreover if his club sell him to either Olympiacos or AEK Athens or PAOK within the next two transfer periods, Panathinaikos will receive €1 million. On 3 January 2016, he scored his first goal in Super League in the second half helping his club to temporarily equalizing the score in a 3–1 home loss against champions Olympiacos.

He started the 2016–17 season as the undisputed leader of the club's defense. He scored his first goal of the season in a 2–0 away win against rivals Xanthi. On 10 April 2017, Nikos Zamanis, the Athletic Manager of Panionios has announced that the player had signed a contract with champions Olympiacos. On 4 July 2017, after the first stage of preparation, Risvanis was not in the plans of Olympiacos' coach Besnik Hasi, with the Greek defender looking abroad as the next step in his career, on a loan season basis.

On 16 July 2017, the talented central defender is expected to continue his career elsewhere, on loan until the end of 2017–18 season. The 23-year-old player is not in the season plans of Albanian manager of the Reds, Besnik Hasi, and will probably have to leave the club and his motherland for the first time in his career, in order to have more playing time. On 26 August 2017, Risvanis joined Atromitos on a season-long loan. Atromitos signed him permanently on 29 May 2018 as part of an exchange deal with Olympiacos for the transfer of goalkeeper Andreas Gianniotis to the Reds.

On 11 November 2018, he scored his first goal with the club in a 2–0 away win against reigning Super League champions AEK Athens at a deserted Olympic Stadium. Two minutes before the final whistle, Risvanis rose highest to connect with a pinpoint corner, heading beyond the stricken Vasilis Barkas and opened the score.
On 1 August 2019, Risvanis scored his first European goal with the head the qualifying goal after an assist from Argentinian midfielder Javier Umbides, helping his club reach the UEFA Europa League third qualifying round thanks to a thrilling 3–2 home win over Dunajská Streda at the Peristeri Stadium which gave the Athens club a 5–3 aggregate success. On 21 September 2019, he scored the only goal after an Alexandros Katranis assist in an away 2–1 loss against Asteras Tripolis.

On 5 January 2021, Spyros Risvanis after 3.5 years and 107 appearances in all competitions solved his contract with Atromitos F.C. and is immediately expected to sign for Cypriot club Anortosis.

International career
On 15 May 2018 he made his debut in the Greece national team in a 2–0 friendly match against Saudi Arabia. On 16 November 2018, in the last game for the UEFA Nations League against Estonia, Risvanis was called up to take Kostas Manolas' place in the roster, as the latter suffered two days earlier an injury during Nations League match at home to Finland and was subbed off in the first half.

Career statistics
As of 12 May 2022

Honours

Club
Panathinaikos
 Greek Cup: 2013–14
Anorthosis Famagusta
Cypriot Cup: 2020–21

Individual
Super League Greece Team of the Year: 2018–19, 2019–20

References

External links

1994 births
Living people
Greek footballers
Greek expatriate footballers
Association football defenders
Greece under-21 international footballers
Greece international footballers
Super League Greece players
Panathinaikos F.C. players
Panionios F.C. players
Olympiacos F.C. players
Atromitos F.C. players
FC DAC 1904 Dunajská Streda players
Slovak Super Liga players
Expatriate footballers in Slovakia

Footballers from Kalamata